Krabi Football Club is a Thai professional football club based in Krabi province. The club is currently playing in the Thai League 2.

Timeline 

History of events of Krabi Football Club

Stadium and locations

Seasons

P = Played
W = Games won
D = Games drawn
L = Games lost
F = Goals for
A = Goals against
Pts = Points
Pos = Final position

TPL = Thai Premier League

QR = Qualifying Round
QR1 = First Qualifying Round
QR2 = Second Qualifying Round
QR3 = Third Qualifying Round
QR4 = Fourth Qualifying Round
QRP = Qualifying Play-off Round
RInt = Intermediate Round
R1 = Round 1
R2 = Round 2
R3 = Round 3

R4 = Round 4
R5 = Round 5
R6 = Round 6
GR = Group stage
QF = Quarter-finals
SF = Semi-finals
RU = Runners-up
S = Shared
W = Winners

Season by season record for team B

Players

Current squad

Club officials

Coaches
''Coaches by Years (2014–present)

Honours

Domestic leagues
Thai League 3
  Runners-up : 2021–22

Thai League 3 Southern Region
  Winners : 2021–22

Regional League South Division
 Winner (1) : 2011

References

External links
 Official Website
 Club information from T2 official website

 
2009 establishments in Thailand
Association football clubs established in 2009
Football clubs in Thailand
Krabi province